Risipeni is a commune in Fălești District, Moldova. It is composed of two villages, Bocșa and Risipeni.

Notable people
 Diomid Gherman, Moldovan researcher and professor;
 Maia Sandu, Moldovan economist, Minister of Education (2012–2015), Prime Minister (2019) and President of Moldova (2020–current).

References

Communes of Fălești District